Francis James Saunders Davies (30 December 1937 – 30 March 2018) was the Anglican Bishop of Bangor from 2000 until 2004.

Davies was educated at the University College of North Wales and Selwyn College, Cambridge. Ordained in 1964, he began his ministry as a curate at Holyhead before being appointed a minor canon of Bangor Cathedral. From 1969 to 1975 he was Rector at Llanllyfni, Canon Missioner of Bangor until 1979 then  Vicar  of Gorseinon and rural dean from 1983. He was Vicar of Eglwys Dewi Sant Caerdydd (Cardiff) between 1986 and 1993. He became the Archdeacon of Meirionnydd in 1993 before his ordination to the episcopate in January 2000. He retired in 2004 and died on 30 March 2018.

References

1937 births
2018 deaths
Alumni of Bangor University
Alumni of Selwyn College, Cambridge
Archdeacons of Merioneth
Bishops of Bangor
21st-century bishops of the Church in Wales